Sebastopolis, also known as Saleia, was a town of ancient Caria, inhabited during Hellenistic, Roman, and Byzantine times. It minted coins in antiquity.

Its site is located near Kızılca in Asiatic Turkey.

References

Populated places in ancient Caria
Former populated places in Turkey
Roman towns and cities in Turkey
Populated places of the Byzantine Empire
History of Denizli Province
Tavas District
Ancient Greek archaeological sites in Turkey